Polidin is an immunomodulator vaccine invented in Romania at the Cantacuzino Institute and licensed in 1966.

References 

Vaccines
Romanian brands